Opalenica  (German Opalenitza, 1943-45 Oppenbach) is a town in Nowy Tomyśl County, Greater Poland Voivodeship, Poland, with 9,861 inhabitants (2007).

The noble de Opalenica Opaliński (also de Bnin Opaliński) family originated here as lords of the area and a branch of the de Bnin Bniński family of Clan Łodzia.

There was a narrow-gauge railway in Opalenica but it closed and was then dismantled to make way for a motorway.

The Portugal National Football Team was based here during the European Championships of 2012 held in Poland and Ukraine.

Gallery

Cities and towns in Greater Poland Voivodeship
Nowy Tomyśl County
Poznań Voivodeship (1921–1939)